Tom Northcott (born August 29, 1943 in Vancouver, British Columbia, Canada) is a Canadian folk-rock singer with hits in the late 1960s and early 1970s.

Musical career
He became known to a Canadian audience by his regular appearances on CBC Television's Let's Go music program in 1964-68. He was nominated as best male vocalist for a Juno Award in 1971.  Later he co-founded Mushroom Studios in Vancouver and produced records. His hits are played regularly on Canadian classic rock radio stations.

"She Loves Me, She Loves Me Not" (1965) was by 'Tom Northcott & the Vancouver Playboys'; the Playboys were an established band that had played around British Columbia since 1962. Northcott joined the band on a tour in 1965, and issued the single on his own label. The 1966 singles were by 'The Tom Northcott Trio', which consisted of Tom Northcott, Chris Dixon (drums), and Rick Enns (bass). Four of his hits were, "1941", "Girl from the North Country", "Suzanne" and "Sunny Goodge Street".

Retirement and life after music
Northcott gave up his performing and singing career in the early 1970s and became a commercial fisherman in British Columbia. He attempted to run in the  1972 British Columbia general election as a member of the Progressive Conservative Party of British Columbia in Vancouver Centre (provincial electoral district) but his nomination papers were not filed on time. He later entered law school which spawned a career in maritime and admiralty law. He is now retired and living in Kamloops, British Columbia. He was inducted into the BC Entertainment Hall of Fame in 2008.

Discography

Albums

Singles

References

External links
CISL Radio 650 AM Classic Rock, Richmond, British Columbia

1943 births
Canadian rock singers
Canadian folk singers
Living people
Musicians from Vancouver
Uni Records artists